Sap is the fluid transported in xylem cells (tracheids or vessel elements) or phloem sieve tube elements of a plant.

Sap may also refer to:
Sap, a trench dug towards an enemy position during sapping
Sap, a baton weapon
Cell sap, the liquid inside the large central vacuole of a plant cell

Places
Sáp, a village in the Hajdú-Bihar county of Hungary
Le Sap, a former commune in France
Sap, Slovakia, a village in the Dunajská Streda District of Slovakia

People
Sap (producer) (born 1990), record producer and rapper
Gustave Sap (1886–1940), Belgian politician, law professor and businessman
Jolande Sap (born 1963), Dutch politician

Arts, entertainment, and media
The Sap, 1924 Broadway farce by William A. Grew
The Sap (1926 film), American silent comedy film based on play by William A. Grew
The Sap (1929 film), American sound remake of 1926 film
Sap (EP), a 1992 EP by Alice in Chains
Aunt Sap, a comic character - see Uncle Cyp and Aunt Sap Brasfield

See also
SAP (disambiguation)
Sapp (disambiguation)
Sapper (disambiguation)
SAPS (disambiguation)